Maksymilian Więcek (18 September 1920 – 28 December 2006) was a Polish athlete. Most notable as an ice hockey player, he played for Cracovia and Legia Warsaw during his career. He won the Polish league title ten times during his career, three with Cracovia and seven with Legia. Jasiński also played for the Polish national team at the 1948 Winter Olympics. After his playing career he studied medicine, receiving a doctorate from the Jagiellonian University Medical College in 1964.

References

External links
 

1920 births
2006 deaths
Ice hockey players at the 1948 Winter Olympics
Jagiellonian University alumni
MKS Cracovia (ice hockey) players
Legia Warsaw (ice hockey) players
Olympic ice hockey players of Poland
People from Lwów Voivodeship
Sportspeople from Podkarpackie Voivodeship
People from Tarnobrzeg County
Polish ice hockey defencemen